Koverdiaki is a village located in a suburban area of Brest, Belarus.

References

Villages in Belarus